Atsushi Watanabe may refer to:

, Japanese politician
, Japanese actor
, Japanese actor